The Australian Weightlifting Federation is the governing body for the sport of Weightlifting in Australia.

Structure
The national body has eight state member associations:
Weightlifting ACT
Northern Territory Weightlifting Assoc Inc
NSW Weightlifting Assoc Limited
Queensland Weightlifting Assoc Inc
South Australian Weightlifting Assoc Inc
Victorian Weightlifting Assoc Inc
Weightlifting Tasmania Inc
Weightlifting Western Australia Inc

External links
 
 

Sports governing bodies in Australia
Weightlifting in Australia
National members of the International Weightlifting Federation
1947 establishments in Australia
Sports organizations established in 1947